Basil Charles "Bill" Pearce (November 29, 1894 – August 2, 1968) was an American politician in the state of Florida.

Pearce was born in Columbia, Alabama. He resided in East Palatka, Florida and was a farmer. Pearce also was a veteran of World War I, having served in France with the United States Army Corps of Engineers. He served in the Florida State Senate from 1947 to 1965 as a Democratic member for the 26th district. He also served briefly in the Florida House of Representatives, from 1933 to 1934.

References

1894 births
1968 deaths
People from Houston County, Alabama
People from Putnam County, Florida
Farmers from Florida
Democratic Party members of the Florida House of Representatives
Democratic Party Florida state senators
Pork Chop Gang
20th-century American politicians